Seltzer is a surname. Notable people with the surname include:

Aaron Seltzer (born 1974), with Jason Friedberg, screenwriter and director of parody films
David Seltzer (born 1940), American screenwriter, producer, and director
H. Jack Seltzer (1922–2011), American politician
Jerry Seltzer (born 1932), second and final owner of the original Roller Derby league
Leo Seltzer (1903–1978), who co-created the sport of roller derby
Margaret Seltzer (born 1975), American writer
Olaf C. Seltzer (1877–1957), Danish-born American painter 
Stan Seltzer, piano player in the Stan Seltzer Trio
Thomas Seltzer (translator), translator and editor of Russian stories
Happy-Tom, born Thomas Seltzer, bassist and main songwriter in the band Turbonegro
Walter Seltzer (born 1914), film producer
Wendy Seltzer, American lawyer

Germanic-language surnames
Jewish surnames